Breastfeeding is highly regarded in Islam. The Qur'an regards it as a sign of love between the mother and child. In Islamic law, breastfeeding creates ties of milk kinship (known as raḍāʿ or riḍāʿa (  ) that has implications in family law. Muslims throughout the world have varied breastfeeding traditions.

Quran and hadith
Several Qur'anic verses, all dating from the Medinan period, lay down the Islamic ethic of breastfeeding
  and  refer to the nursing of Islamic prophet Moses to emphasize the loving bond between baby Moses and his mother.

Breastfeeding is considered a basic right of every infant, according to the Qur'an.  calls on fathers to sponsor the child's nursing by providing food and clothing for the child's mother for two years, although it allows for earlier weaning of the child by mutual consent of both mother and father. The same verse also allows for motherly breastfeeding to be substituted by wet nursing.  expects the father of the child to be generous towards the wet nurse.

The Quran regards ties due to milk kinship similar to ties due to blood kinship. Therefore  prohibits a man from having sexual relations with his "milk mother" or "milk sister"; hadith explain that the wet-nurse's husband is also included as a milk kin, eg. a woman may not marry her wet-nurse's husband.
According to scholars, this prohibition is not found in the Jewish and Christian tradition, though it is found in matrilineal groups.

In Islamic law 
Breastfeeding is considered  one of the most fundamental rights of a child in Islamic law. Muslim jurists have given extensive treatment to this topic, for example Al-Mawardi (d. 1058) wrote an entire treatise Kitab al-rada on the topic of breastfeeding. This includes the specifics related to the right of being breastfed, as well as implications of breastfeeding on prohibiting marriage between individuals related by milk kinship.

Right to breastfeeding 
The right to be breastfed is considered one of the most important rights of a child in Islamic law. If the mother is unable to breastfeed the child, then the father must pay a wet nurse to do so. If the parents of the child are divorced, the father must compensate his former wife with payments during breastfeeding. The Jafaris further opine that a mother has the right to compensation for breastfeeding even if the parents are married. However, the Sunni schools of thought disagree, arguing the father is not obligated to pay the mother if the two are divorced; the wife already has the right to maintenance (food and clothing) under Islamic law.

Some opinions hold that a mother has the right to breastfeed her children, but can choose not to if she wishes. This is an extension of the general principle, in Islamic law, that a mother has the right to raise her children, but she may renounce this right as it is not her duty.

Milk kinship for infants 
The Qur'an regards breastfeeding to establish milk kinship which has implications for marriage.

Islamic jurisprudence extensively discusses the precise delineation of which relationships are subject to prohibition once the milk relationship is established. Shi'ite Islam also prohibits marriage to the consanguineous kin of a milk-parent as per the Qur'an. In Shi'ite societies, the wet nurse was always from a subordinate group, so that marriage to her kin would not have been likely. Texts mentioned that Ahmad ibn Hanbal, founder of the Hanbali school of jurisprudence, also dealt with similar questions.

The minimum number of sucklings necessary to establish the milk-kinship, has been the subject of extensive debate. For the adherents of older schools of law, such as the Malikis and Hanafis, one suckling was enough. Others, such as the Shafiʿis, maintain that the minimum number was five or ten, arguing that a Qur'ānic verse had once stipulated this number until had been abrogated from the Qur'ānic text, but the ruling was still in place. Imam Malik, however, believed that the ruling was abrogated along with the wording.

Adult suckling 
The following tradition (hadith) treats both this topic as well as that of radāʿ al-kabīr, or suckling of an adult or breastfeeding an adult and number of sucklings:

For most jurists (Ibn Hazm being one prominent exception), the bar to marriage was effective only if the nursling was an infant. Yet even these allowed that a new relationship resulted between the two; Ibn Rushd, for example, ruled that the woman could now comport herself more freely in front of the nursed adult male, such as appearing before him unveiled. The famous traditionist Muhammad al-Bukhari was forced to resign his position of mufti and leave the city of Bukhara after ruling that two nurslings who suckled from the same farm animal became milk-siblings.

In May 2007, Dr. Izzat Atiyya, lecturer at Cairo's Al-Azhar University, issued a fatwa that suggested that male and female colleagues could use breastfeeding to get around a religious ban on being alone together.  The fatwa said that if a woman fed a male colleague "directly from her breast" at least five times they would establish a family bond and thus be allowed to be alone together at work. "Breast feeding an adult puts an end to the problem of the private meeting, and does not ban marriage," he ruled. "A woman at work can take off the veil or reveal her hair in front of someone whom she breastfed." The fatwa sparked outrage and embarrassment, with critics deriding the author on Egyptian television. The university suspended the lecturer, who headed the university's hadith department.  The fatwa was widely publicized by Arabic-language satellite television channels and was discussed in the Egyptian parliament.  After being threatened with disciplinary action by the university, Atiyya issued a retraction, saying the fatwa was "a bad interpretation of a particular case" during the time of Muhammad and that it was based on the opinions of only a minority of scholars.  Egypt's minister of religious affairs, Mahmoud Zaqzouq, has called for future fatwas to "be compatible with logic and human nature".

In 2010, a clerical adviser to the Saudi royal court and Ministry of Justice issued a fatwa suggesting that women should provide breast milk to their employed drivers thereby making them relatives. The driver could then be trusted to be alone with the woman. The fatwa was ridiculed by women campaigners.

See also 

 Fiqh
 Islamic marital jurisprudence
 Mahram
 Islam and children
 Islamic feminism
 Women and Islam
 Milk kinship

References

Further reading

 
 
 

Islamic jurisprudence
Fatwas
Islam-related controversies
Breastfeeding
Kinship and descent
Islamic terminology
Wet nursing